Stephen Sulyk (October 2, 1924 – April 6, 2020) was a Ukrainian-American hierarch who was an archbishop of the Ukrainian Greek Catholic Church. He died from complications brought on by COVID-19 during the COVID-19 pandemic.

Biography
Sulyk was born in Ukrainian village Balnica, Poland. On March 1, 1981, Sulyk was appointed Archbishop of Philadelphia. On February 27, 2001, he was succeeded by Stefan Soroka as Archbishop of Philadelphia. 

On April 5, 2020, Sulyk was taken to hospital due to COVID-19 where he died in April 2020, at the age of 95.

See also

 Catholic Church hierarchy
 Catholic Church in the United States
 Historical list of the Catholic bishops of the United States
 List of Catholic bishops of the United States
 Lists of patriarchs, archbishops, and bishops

Notes

External links
Ukrainian Catholic Archeparchy of Philadelphia Official Site

1924 births
2020 deaths
People from Sanok County
Lemkos
Eastern Catholic bishops in the United States
Bishops in Pennsylvania
Polish emigrants to the United States
Deaths from the COVID-19 pandemic in Pennsylvania
Archbishops of the Ukrainian Greek Catholic Church
Eastern Catholic archeparchs in North America